Guerrilla is a 2011 Bangladeshi film based on the events of the Bangladesh Liberation War. It is an adaptation of the novel Nishiddho Loban by Syed Shamsul Huq and was released on 14 April 2011. It has been envisioned by the director of the film Nasiruddin Yousuf Bachchu. He has crafted the film Guerrilla with his own experience as a freedom fighter of 1971.

Plot 
On the ominous night of 25 March 1971, a heinous military operation, the Operation Searchlight an operation designed to kill indiscriminately the innocent democracy loving millions, was initiated by the Pakistan Army. The hated operation was just the beginning of the worst genocide to follow, a brutal crime against humanity after the Second World War. On that very night, Hasan Ahmed, a veteran journalist of the country, husband of Bilkis (Joya Ahsan), simply vanished while on his way to his newspaper office to perform his journalistic duty. He is untraceable till date. Bilkis was in banking profession. She started a desperate search for her husband and at the same time got herself engaged as a collaborator to the guerrilla operations which were gradually gaining momentum. She was not affected by her personal loss and pain, rather, undaunted; she chose the hazardous path to carry on the fight for our liberation. With the guerrilla fighters like Shahadat, Alam, Maya, Kazi Kamal, Fateh Ali and others operating in Dhaka, she started participating directly in many dangerous and successful operations. She was in constant touch with Altaf Mahmud, the legendary personality of Bengali Nation's musical arena and scorer of many revolutionary songs. She thus became the central character in the movie, also a target to the enemy. Bilkis, Shahin and many others got involved in the publication of a secret English News bulletin The GUERRILLA, obviously from the underground. Incidentally, at a particular point of time, Taslim Ali Sardar, a traditional Chieftain of the old Dhaka's subsector (Moholla), who courageously sheltered ill-fated Bilkis, got brutally killed by the Pakistani Army and their lackeys--- the hated rajakars. At one point, Altaf Mahmud, Rumi, Bodi along with some other freedom fighters were captured. Altaf and few others like him did never return, could never be traced, a tragic fact well known to us today. Bilkis, a lonely character now, could evade the worse, and tactfully leave the labyrinth- like barriers and traps set by the occupational army around Dhaka. She could get into a train to her home, Joleswari, a remote village at Rangpur. The metallic train transforms into a character, a symbolic one, a moving replica designed to depict a catastrophic journey. The parents of Bilkis were killed in the communal riots of January '71 earlier.. She just was desperately longing to meet her own brother: Khokon at Joleswari. Khokon was then a commander of the local freedom fighters. Pakistan Army units were on the verge of collapse due to consistent fierce attacks initiated by those fighters. Khokon dynamited a vital railway bridge near Joleswari, interrupting all train movements. . She had to reach her brother. Nothing could deter her. She opted to walk. On her way, she got a young vibrant male companion, Siraj, a member of Khokon's fighting group. At one point Khokon was captured by the Pakistan Army. The brutal Army and Rajakar predators slaughtered him along with other captured freedom fighters. Bilkis wanted to have a glimpse of her dead brother, wanted to touch his apparently cold, inert body to feel the warmth of a loving brother, the heat of the fire inside him which no killer could extinguish. Khokon was a living, pulsating symbol of our ongoing freedom fight. She, risking her life, could enter the 'killing fields' of the occupants but was captured immediately by them. Bilkis was captured but she did never surrender to the heinous forces. For her country, for the entire freedom loving humanity, she did set up an example, a glorious one. She does not allow her body, the body of the fledgling Bangladesh, to be molested by the vultures of Pakistan. She blew herself up with explosives, destroying the surrounding mocking dogs in the process.

Cast 

Jaya Ahsan as Bilkish Banu
Ferdous Ahmed as Hasan Ahmed
Pijush Bandyopaddhay as Anwar Hossain
Ahmed Rubel as Altaf Mahmud
Masum Aziz
Shatabdi Wadud as Captain Shamsad / Major Sarfaraj
Shampa Reza as Mrs. Khan
ATM Shamsuzzaman as Taslim Sardar
Azad Abul Kalam as Tyeb
Shajjad Ahmed as Siraj
Bidushi Bornita as Shawon
Kachi Khandakar

Production 
Nasiruddin Yousuff and Ebadur Rahman were the script writers of the film. Shimul Yousuf was the music director of 'Guerrilla'. Art direction was given by Animesh Aich. Samiron Datta was the cinematographer and Shimul Yousuff was the costume designer. The movie was shot in 127 different locations with wonderful cinematography. The sound effect was done in Mumbai.

Awards

National Film Awards 
Guerrilla, won the 2011 National Film Awards highest award of the 10 categories.

 Best Film – Faridur Reza Sagar, Ibne Hasan and Esha Yusuf (producer)
 Best Director – Nasiruddin Yousuff
 Best Screenwriter – Ebadur Rahman, Nasiruddin Yousuff
 Best Dialogue –  Ebadur Rahman, Nasiruddin Yousuff
 Best Actress – Joya Ahsan
 Best Villain – Shatabdi Wadud (jointly with Misha Sawdagar for Boss Number One)
 Best Editor – Sami Ahmed
 Best Art Director – Animesh Aich
 Best makeup man – Md. Ali Babul
 Best Clothing and decor – Shimul Yousuf

Meril Prothom Alo Awards
Guerilla received Awards in 4 categories for the Best Bangladeshi Film in the 2011 Meril Prothom Alo Awards.

 Best Film (Critics branch)
 Best Film Director Award (Nasir Uddin Yusuf)
 Best film artist (women) (Jaya Ahsan)
 Special Prize ATM Shamsuzzaman
 Best Child Actor Bidushi Bornita

References

External links
 
 

2011 films
2011 war drama films
Bengali-language Bangladeshi films
Bangladeshi war drama films
2010s Urdu-language films
Films based on Bangladeshi novels
Films scored by Shimul Yousuf
Films based on the Bangladesh Liberation War
Films set in 1971
2010s Bengali-language films
2011 drama films
Best Film Bachsas Award winners
Best Film National Film Award (Bangladesh) winners
Films whose writer won the Best Screenplay National Film Award (Bangladesh)
Guerrilla warfare in film
Impress Telefilm films